The National University of Tierra del Fuego, Antarctica and South Atlantic Islands is an Argentine national university in Tierra del Fuego Province. The campus university is located in the city of Ushuaia. The institution was founded through National Law 26.559, enacted by Congress on November 14, 2009, and was formally established on December 28, 2010.

Developed from the Ushuaia campus of the National University of Patagonia San Juan Bosco, UNTDF maintains 11 undergraduate schools, including political science, sociology, tourism, and economics. it offers four post-graduate studies, (Antarctic studies, Mathematics, Literature, and Biology), as well as four institutes (Environmental Science, Education, Culture, and Innovation).

See also

Science and Education in Argentina
Argentine Higher Education Official Site
 Argentine Universities

Tierra del Fuego
Educational institutions established in 2010
Universities in Tierra del Fuego Province, Argentina
Ushuaia
2010 establishments in Argentina